Graves Mill Historic District is a national historic district located near Ashland, New Castle County, Delaware.  It encompasses 7 contributing buildings and 2 contributing structures that are associated with Graves Mill.  They include the Samuel Graves Mill, the Hayes Graves House and barn, the David Graves House and barn, and two houses associated with William Armstrong.

It was added to the National Register of Historic Places in 1979.

References

Historic districts on the National Register of Historic Places in Delaware
Historic districts in New Castle County, Delaware
National Register of Historic Places in New Castle County, Delaware